Samkovo is a rural locality (a selo) in Verkh-Invenskoye Rural Settlement, Kudymkarsky District, Perm Krai, Russia. The population was 378 as of 2010. There are 12 streets.

Geography 
Samkovo is located 42 km southwest of Kudymkar (the district's administrative centre) by road. Berezovka is the nearest rural locality.

References 

Rural localities in Kudymkarsky District